Not George Washington is a semi-autobiographical novel by P. G. Wodehouse, written in collaboration with Herbert Westbrook. The United Kingdom is the country of first publication on 18 October 1907 by Cassell and Co., London.

Much of the book is a lightly fictionalised account of Wodehouse's early career as a writer and journalist in London.  For example, from 1904 to 1909 Wodehouse edited the "By the Way" column for the now-defunct The Globe newspaper, while the book's main character, James Orlebar Cloyster, writes the "On Your Way" column for the Orb newspaper.

The tale is told from several viewpoints.

References

External links
The Wodehouse Society's page
The P G Wodehouse Society (UK)
The Russian Wodehouse Society's page, with numerous book covers and a list of characters
Free eBook of Not George Washington at Project Gutenberg

Novels by P. G. Wodehouse
1907 British novels
British autobiographical novels
Novels about journalists
Novels set in London
Cassell (publisher) books